Somain may refer to:

 Somain, Nord, a commune in France

See also
 Soman, a nerve agent
 Somain-Péruwelz Railway
 Somain-Halluin Railway
 Soman (disambiguation)